Mișu is a Romanian-language first name and surname, most often a pet form of the name Mihai ("Michael")—its intermediate origin is the French affectionate name Michou (also Michoux and Michoud), from Michel. Used on its own, it may refer to:

People

First name
 Mișu Benvenisti (1902–1977), Romanian Zionist leader
 Mișu Dulgheru (1909–2002), Romanian communist activist and spy
 Mișu Popp (1827–1892), Romanian painter and muralist
 Mișu Văcărescu (1840s–1903), Romanian fashion journalist and gossip columnist

Last name
 Georgian Mișu (born 2001), Romanian professional footballer
 Nicolae Mișu (1858–1924), Romanian politician and diplomat

Places
 Mișu River

References

Romanian masculine given names
Hypocorisms